Goran Georgievski (born 10 September 1965) is a retired Macedonian football midfielder.

References

1965 births
Living people
Macedonian footballers
FK Sileks players
FK Makedonija Gjorče Petrov players
Association football midfielders
North Macedonia international footballers